Marianna Spring (born 21 February 1996) is a British broadcast journalist. She is the BBC's first specialist disinformation and social media correspondent.

Biography
Spring was born on 21 February 1996. She has a sister. Spring reports an early interest in journalism from the age of eight which included watching BBC World News on holiday. She attended Sutton High School, London, and while there she was involved in a programme run by Newsquest for young journalists, winning an award for the best news article of 2011 by a Year Eleven student. She studied French and Russian at Pembroke College, Oxford (matriculating in 2014) and wrote for and later became the editor of the student newspaper Cherwell. Spring won the Ronnie Payne Prize for Outstanding Foreign Reporting in 2017. She spent her year abroad in Yaroslavl, Russia and Paris, France and contributed news articles to The Moscow Times, The Local, and Le Tarn Libre. During university, Spring also undertook work experience at The Guardian and Private Eye. After graduation, she applied for various journalism programmes including for the BBC but was not successful. Senior news reporter for The Guardian Alexandra Topping suggested that Spring contact various BBC journalists that she admired. Emily Maitlis replied to Spring and gave her an opportunity to work on Newsnight. 

In March 2020, she was appointed as the BBC's first specialist disinformation and social media reporter which followed the establishment of similar roles at American news organisations such as CNN and NBC. In 2021 Spring started to work as a reporter for current affairs documentary programme Panorama and was selected by Forbes as one of their Media and Marketing "30 Under 30" in 2021.

She was promoted to correspondent in August 2022. Spring was nominated as Young Talent of the Year at the Royal Television Society's Journalism Awards in 2023. Her debut book Among the Trolls: Notes From the Disinformation Wars is due for publication from Atlantic Books in autumn 2023.

Television

Radio

References

External links
 

Alumni of Pembroke College, Oxford
BBC newsreaders and journalists
People educated at Sutton High School, London
English women journalists
English journalists
1996 births
Living people